"I Wonder Where We'd Be Tonight" is a song co-written and recorded by American country music artist Vern Gosdin.  It was released in October 1983 as the third single from the album If You're Gonna Do Me Wrong (Do It Right).  The song reached #10 on the Billboard Hot Country Singles & Tracks chart.  Gosdin wrote the song with Jim Sales.

Chart performance

References

1983 singles
1983 songs
Vern Gosdin songs
Songs written by Vern Gosdin